Thomas Jordan Jarvis (January 18, 1836June 17, 1915) was the 44th governor of the U.S. state of North Carolina from 1879 to 1885. Jarvis later served as a U.S. Senator from 1894 to 1895, and helped establish East Carolina Teachers Training School, now known as East Carolina University, in 1907.

Biography

Early years 
Born in Jarvisburg, North Carolina, in Currituck County, he was the son of Elizabeth Daley and Bannister Hardy Jarvis, a Methodist minister and farmer and brother of George, Ann, Margaret, and Elizabeth.  His family was of English descent and some of its members highlighted at various points in the history of North Carolina. So, Thomas Jarvis was lieutenant governor of Albemarle during the government of Philip Ludwell, between 1691–97, and General Samuel Jarvis led the militia of Albemarle during his fight in the Revolutionary War. Raised in a poor family, although he had the necessities of life, Jarvis worked when he was young in three hundred acre farm owned by his father, while he was studying about the common schools. Jarvis was educated locally and at nineteen went on to attend Randoph-Macon College, earning an M.A. in 1861. He had to exercise as teacher during the summer to pay for college tuition. An educator by training, Jarvis opened a school in Pasquotank County and would later be one of the founders of East Carolina University.

Career 

Jarvis enlisted in the military at the beginning of the American Civil War and served in the Eighth North Carolina Regiment. On April 22, 1863 he was named Captain. Captured and exchanged in 1862, Jarvis, was injured and permanently disabled at the Battle of Drewry's Bluff in 1864. After the war ended, he was on sick leave in Norfolk and in May 1865, he got probation, returning to  Jarvisburg.

In 1865, Jarvis returned home and opened a general store before being named a delegate to the 1865 state constitutional convention. In 1867 Jarvis bought entrepreneur William H. Happer's share of his small general store. More late, after get a license in June of that year, he abandoned the store and moved to Columbia.

Active in the Democratic Party, Jarvis was elected to the State House in 1868 and served there for four years, two of them (1870–1872) as Speaker of the House. In 1872, he was a Democratic elector-at-large on the Horace Greeley ticket. Jarvis also married Mary Woodson in December 1874.

An opponent of federal Reconstruction policy, Jarvis was elected the third lieutenant governor in 1876 on a ticket with Zebulon Vance. In 1879, Vance resigned the governorship to serve in the United States Senate, and Jarvis filled the vacant position. As governor, he fought against government corruption and attempted to cut taxes, the state's debt, and government control. He also completed the sale of various state railways to private companies. He established mental health services in Morganton and Goldsboro, managed the establishment of normal schools for teachers in North Carolina and helped develop the State Board of Health.

He won election in his own right in 1880, defeating Daniel G. Fowle for the Democratic nomination and narrowly winning over Republican challenger Ralph Buxton. In office, Jarvis convinced the legislature to authorize construction of the North Carolina Executive Mansion, although it was not completed until 1891. He "supported establishing a system of county superintendents of education elected by boards of education, grades of teacher certification, standards of examinations for public school teachers, and lists of recommended textbooks. Also, Funds for the mental institutions continued to increase, and the laws of North Carolina were for the first time codified and state insurance laws fully defined. Also, was built a governor's mansion".

Term-limited, Jarvis stepped down as governor in 1885, but was appointed United States Minister to Brazil by President Grover Cleveland. Jarvis held this post for four years, after which he practiced law in Greenville, North Carolina. Following Senator Vance's death in 1894, Jarvis again succeeded him in office, serving as a U.S. Senator through an appointment by Gov. Elias Carr. In 1895, the state legislature, now under the control of Republicans and Populists, would not elect Jarvis to a term of his own.

In 1896, Jarvis was a delegate to the Democratic National Convention, where he supported William Jennings Bryan in his last major political act. He was instrumental in the founding of what is now East Carolina University in Greenville, where the oldest residential hall on campus is named in his memory.

In 1898, while not directly involved, Jarvis's political rhetoric may have contributed to the Wilmington insurrection of 1898, a violent coup d'état by a group of white supremacists. They expelled opposition black and white political leaders from the city, destroyed the property and businesses of black citizens built up since the Civil War, including the only black newspaper in the city, and killed an estimated 60 to more than 300 people.

Jarvis reopened his law firm and in 1912, he founded a partnership with Frank Wooten. In November of 1914, Jarvis presided over the unveiling of the Pitt County Confederate Soldiers' Monument. 

He died at his home in Greenville on June 17, 1915.

Legacy 
 In addition to the ECU residence hall, a local United Methodist church and a street in Greenville are named in his memory. 
 At one time, several personal artifacts were on display at the church.

Personal life 
Jarvis married Mary Woodson in December 1874.

See also
North Carolina General Assembly of 1868–1869

Notes

External links
 
 East Carolina University Icons Gallery profile
 Thomas J. Jarvis Papers (#616), East Carolina Manuscript Collection, J. Y. Joyner Library, East Carolina University, Greenville, North Carolina, USA.

1836 births
1915 deaths
Democratic Party governors of North Carolina
19th-century American diplomats
Lieutenant Governors of North Carolina
Democratic Party United States senators from North Carolina
Speakers of the North Carolina House of Representatives
Democratic Party members of the North Carolina House of Representatives
People from Currituck County, North Carolina
American people of English descent
People of North Carolina in the American Civil War
East Carolina University
Ambassadors of the United States to Brazil
19th-century American politicians
Wilmington insurrection of 1898